The 1990 Fort Lauderdale Strikers season was the first season of the team in the new American Professional Soccer League.  It was the club's twenty-fourth season in professional soccer.  In the previous year, the club fielded the team in the American Soccer League which then merged with the Western Soccer Alliance to form the new APSL.  In the inaugural year of the new league, the team finished in first place in the South Division of the East (American Soccer League) Conference.  They went to the playoffs and made it to the finals of the East (American Soccer League) Conference being that year's Runners-up.  At the end of the year, the team would merge with the league's Orlando Lions, creating a new unified team and club.

Background

Review

Competitions

APSL regular season

East (American Soccer League) Conference
Points:
Win: 3
Shoot out win: 2
Shoot out loss: 1

North Division

South Division

West (Western Soccer League) Conference
Points:
Win: 6
Shoot out win: 4
Shoot out loss: 2
1 bonus point per goal scored in regulation, maximum of 3 per game

North Division

South Division

Results summaries

Results by round

Match reports

APSL Eastern Conference Playoffs

Semifinal 1

Semifinal 2

Final

Bracket

Match reports

Statistics

Transfers

References 

1990
Fort Lauderdale Strikers
Fort Lauderdale Strikers